Dieter Kunzelmann (14 July 1939 – 14 May 2018) was a German left-wing terrorist.  In the early 1960s he was a member of the Situationist-inspired artists' group Gruppe SPUR.  He was one of the founders of Kommune 1 in 1967.  At the end of the 1960s he was one of the leaders of the Tupamaros West-Berlin, which carried out bombings and arsons.  He was arrested in July 1970 and served five years in prison for those activities.  From 1983 to 1985 he served in the Berlin state parliament as a member of the Alternative List (now Alliance '90/The Greens).  In 1997 he was sentenced to a year in prison for throwing an egg at the mayor of Berlin, Eberhard Diepgen.  He went into hiding for two years, reappearing to serve his sentence in 1999.

References

1939 births
2018 deaths
People from Bamberg
Außerparlamentarische Opposition
Sozialistischer Deutscher Studentenbund members
German activists
German politicians